The 2014 PGA Championship was the 96th PGA Championship, played August 7–10 at Valhalla Golf Club in Louisville, Kentucky. This was the third PGA Championship at Valhalla, which previously hosted in 1996 and 2000, both won in playoffs, as well as the Ryder Cup in 2008.

Rory McIlroy won his second PGA Championship and fourth career major title, one stroke ahead of runner-up Phil Mickelson.

Venue

Previous course lengths for major championships
  – par 72, 2000 PGA Championship
  – par 72, 1996 PGA Championship
The second hole was previously played as a par 5.

Field
The following qualification criteria were used to select the field. Each player is listed according to the first category by which he qualified with additional categories in which he qualified shown in parentheses.

1. All former PGA Champions
Rich Beem, Keegan Bradley (8,9), Mark Brooks, John Daly, Jason Dufner (6,8,9,10), Pádraig Harrington, Martin Kaymer (2,8,9,10), Davis Love III, Rory McIlroy (2,4,6,8,9,10), Shaun Micheel, Phil Mickelson (3,4,8,9), Vijay Singh, Tiger Woods (8,9), Yang Yong-eun
David Toms (6) withdrew due to a back injury.

The following former champions did not compete: Paul Azinger, Jack Burke Jr., Steve Elkington, Dow Finsterwald, Raymond Floyd, Doug Ford, Al Geiberger, Wayne Grady, David Graham, Hubert Green, Don January, John Mahaffey, Larry Nelson, Bobby Nichols, Jack Nicklaus, Gary Player, Nick Price, Jeff Sluman, Dave Stockton, Hal Sutton, Lee Trevino, Bob Tway, Lanny Wadkins

2. Last five U.S. Open Champions
Graeme McDowell (6,8,9), Justin Rose (8,9,10), Webb Simpson (8,9,10)

3. Last five Masters Champions
Charl Schwartzel (8), Adam Scott (6,8,10), Bubba Watson (8,9,10)

4. Last five British Open Champions
Darren Clarke, Ernie Els, Louis Oosthuizen

5. Current Senior PGA Champion
Colin Montgomerie

6. 15 low scorers and ties in the 2013 PGA Championship
Jonas Blixt (8), Roberto Castro, Jason Day (8,10), Jim Furyk (8,9), Zach Johnson (8,9,10), Marc Leishman (8), Scott Piercy, Henrik Stenson (8,10), Kevin Streelman (8,10), Steve Stricker (8,9), Marc Warren, Boo Weekley

Dustin Johnson (8,9,10) did not play for personal reasons.

7. 20 low scorers in the 2014 PGA Professional National Championship
Michael Block, Jamie Broce, Rob Corcoran, Stuart Deane, Frank Esposito Jr., Ryan Helminen, David Hronek, Johan Kok, Aaron Krueger, Jim McGovern, Dave McNabb, Brian Norman, Rod Perry, Matt Pesta, Steve Schneiter, Jerry Smith, Bob Sowards, David Tentis, Dustin Volk, Eric Williamson

8. Top 70 leaders in official money standings from the 2013 WGC-Bridgestone Invitational to the 2014 RBC Canadian Open
Jason Bohn, Steven Bowditch (10), Ángel Cabrera (10), K. J. Choi, Tim Clark (10), Erik Compton, Ben Crane (10), Brendon de Jonge, Graham DeLaet (12), Luke Donald (9), Harris English (10), Matt Every (10), Rickie Fowler, Sergio García (9), Bill Haas, Brian Harman (10), Russell Henley (10), Charley Hoffman, J. B. Holmes (10), Billy Horschel, Charles Howell III, Freddie Jacobson (12), Matt Jones (10), Chris Kirk (10), Will MacKenzie, Hunter Mahan, Ben Martin (12), Hideki Matsuyama (10), George McNeill, Ryan Moore (10), Kevin Na, Noh Seung-yul (10), Ryan Palmer, Ian Poulter (9), Patrick Reed (10), Rory Sabbatini, John Senden (10), Brandt Snedeker (9), Jordan Spieth, Kevin Stadler (10), Brendan Steele, Chris Stroud, Brian Stuard, Daniel Summerhays, Brendon Todd (10), Jimmy Walker (10), Nick Watney, Gary Woodland

Matt Kuchar (9,10) withdrew with a back injury.

9. Members of the United States and European 2012 Ryder Cup teams (provided they are ranked in the top 100 in the Official World Golf Ranking on July 28)
Francesco Molinari, Lee Westwood
Nicolas Colsaerts (ranked 172), Peter Hanson (119), and Paul Lawrie (215) were not ranked in the top 100.

10. Winners of tournaments co-sponsored or approved by the PGA Tour since the 2013 PGA Championship
Chesson Hadley, Geoff Ogilvy, Scott Stallings

11. Vacancies are filled by the first available player from the list of alternates (those below 70th place in official money standings).
Scott Brown, Russell Knox, Cameron Tringale, Jason Kokrak

12. The PGA of America reserves the right to invite additional players not included in the categories listed above
Kiradech Aphibarnrat, Thomas Bjørn, Rafa Cabrera-Bello, Paul Casey, Kevin Chappell, Stewart Cink, George Coetzee, Jamie Donaldson, Victor Dubuisson, Gonzalo Fernández-Castaño, Ross Fisher, Tommy Fleetwood, Stephen Gallacher, Branden Grace, David Hearn, Mikko Ilonen, Ryo Ishikawa, Thongchai Jaidee, Miguel Ángel Jiménez, Robert Karlsson, Kim Hyung-sung, Brooks Koepka, Anirban Lahiri, Pablo Larrazábal, Alexander Lévy, Shane Lowry, Joost Luiten, Matteo Manassero, Edoardo Molinari, Koumei Oda, Thorbjørn Olesen, Kenny Perry, Richard Sterne, Hideto Tanihara, Tom Watson, Bernd Wiesberger, Danny Willett, Chris Wood, Fabrizio Zanotti
Paul McGinley withdrew after a left-shoulder injury.

Alternates (category 11)
Jerry Kelly – replaced Dustin Johnson
Pat Perez – took spot reserved for WGC-Bridgestone Invitational winner
Shawn Stefani – replaced David Toms
John Huh – replaced Matt Kuchar

Round summaries

First round
Thursday, August 7, 2014

Lee Westwood recorded nine birdies, including his last four holes, to offset a double-bogey for a round of 65 (−6) and join Kevin Chappell and Ryan Palmer in a tie for first. Rory McIlroy also rebounded from a double-bogey with four straight birdies on the back nine and was one shot behind. Defending champion Jason Dufner entered the championship with a neck injury and withdrew after ten holes at +8.

Second round
Friday, August 8, 2014

Rory McIlroy, who had regained the world number one spot the previous Monday, held the 36-hole lead. The low round went to Jason Day with a 65.

Third round
Saturday, August 9, 2014

Rory McIlroy birdied three of his last four holes for a round of 67 (−4). Bernd Wiesberger recorded birdies on his last three holes to record the lowest score of the round with a 65 (−6) and move into second place, one shot behind. A tight leaderboard saw five players tied for the lead at 10-under at one point on the back-nine. The scoring average for the round was 69.6, the lowest in PGA Championship history.

Final round
Sunday, August 10, 2014

Finishing the round in almost complete darkness, Rory McIlroy made par on the 18th to win his fourth career and second consecutive major championship. Beginning the round with a one-shot advantage, McIlroy fell from the lead with two bogeys on his first six holes. Rickie Fowler recorded birdies on four out of five holes on the front-nine, Phil Mickelson made four birdies on his first nine while Henrik Stenson made five birdies on the front to each pass McIlroy. Down by as much as three shots, McIlroy jumped back into contention with an eagle at the 10th to get within one shot. Fowler and Stenson both made bogey on the 14th, while Mickelson bogeyed the 16th. McIlroy, meanwhile, birdied the 13th and 17th to get to 16-under-par. Needing eagle on 18 to tie McIlroy, Mickelson's chip from off the green narrowly missed while Fowler missed on a lengthy putt. McIlroy found a greenside bunker at the last then two-putted for par and a one-shot win over Mickelson. With this win McIlroy became the first player since Tiger Woods in 2008 to win three straight starts on the PGA Tour (he previously won the Open Championship and the WGC-Bridgestone Invitational), and the first since Pádraig Harrington to win consecutive majors. Harrington won the same two in 2008, the Open Championship and PGA Championship.	
	

Source

Scorecard
Final round

Cumulative tournament scores, relative to par

Source

References

External links

Professional Golfers Association of America
Coverage on the PGA Tour's official site
Coverage on the European Tour's official site
Valhalla Golf Club
Local coverage from Louisville Courier-Journal

PGA Championship
Golf in Kentucky
Sports competitions in Louisville, Kentucky
PGA Championship
PGA Championship
PGA Championship
PGA Championship